Borwick is a civil parish in Lancaster, Lancashire, England. It contains 27 listed buildings that are recorded in the National Heritage List for England. Of these, three are listed at Grade I, the top grade, and the others are at Grade II, the lowest of the three grades of listing.  The parish contains the village of Borwick, and is otherwise rural.  The most important building in the parish is Borwick Hall; this and a number of associated buildings and structures are listed.  The Lancaster Canal passes through the parish, and associated with it are five listed bridges and an aqueduct.  The other listed buildings include houses, farm buildings, bridges over the River Keer, a church, a milestone, and a telephone kiosk.

Key

Buildings

References

Citations

Sources

Lists of listed buildings in Lancashire
Buildings and structures in the City of Lancaster